"Tajomstvo hier" is a song by the band Modus with lead vocals by Janko Lehotský and Marika Gombitová. released on OPUS in 1980.

The single, written by Janko Lehotský and Kamil Peteraj, won the Bronze award at the Bratislavská lýra '80 in the contest of the Czechoslovak authors.

However, the song was initially released as B-side of Gombitová's solo single "Svet stromov" in 1980, also on the Modus fourth set Záhradná kaviareň (1983).

Official versions
 "Tajomstvo hier" - Studio version, 1980

Credits and personnel
 Janko Lehotský - lead vocal, music
 Marika Gombitová - lead vocal
 Kamil Peteraj - lyrics
 OPUS Records - copyright

Awards

Bratislavská lýra
Bratislavská lýra was an annual festival of popular songs in former Czechoslovakia, established in 1966 in Bratislava. Two competitions were held; the category of Czechoslovak songwriters and the international contest. Winners were awarded by a golden, silver and/or bronze Lyre (depending on a position). Special prizes included Audience Choice, Journalists Choice, and Lifetime Achievement award. Gombitová won seven awards in total - three golden lyres (1977–78), one of silver (1979) and bronze (1980), plus an Audience Choice award (1977).

References

General

  
Specific

1980 songs
1980 singles
Modus (band) songs
Songs written by Ján Lehotský
Songs written by Kamil Peteraj
Slovak-language songs